Andrew Francis Krepinevich Jr. (born 13 February 1950) is a defense policy analyst who is a distinguished senior fellow at (and former longtime president of) the Center for Strategic and Budgetary Assessments.

Army service
Born in New York State, Krepinevich graduated from West Point with a B.S. degree in 1972. He then spent 21 years as an officer in the U.S. Army, serving on the personal staff of three Defense Secretaries and in the Office of Net Assessment, retiring in the rank of lieutenant colonel. While in the army, Krepinevich received an M.P.A. from the Harvard Kennedy School in 1980 and then earned a Ph.D. at Harvard University in 1984 while teaching social sciences at the U.S. Military Academy. His doctoral thesis was entitled The Army concept and Vietnam: a case study in organizational failure. He then published an influential book, The Army and Vietnam, in 1986 in which he argued that the United States could have won the Vietnam War had the Army adopted a small-unit pacification strategy in South Vietnam's villages, rather than conducting search and destroy operations in remote jungles.  While working for the Office of Net Assessment in 1992, Krepinevich authored "The Military-Technical Revolution: A Preliminary Assessment," an influential document in the development of thinking about the "Revolution in Military Affairs."

Civilian career
Following his retirement from the army, Krepinevich assumed his current position as director of the Center for Strategic and Budgetary Assessments, a non-profit think tank focused on defense and national security issues. While at CSBA he has served on the National Defense Panel and Defense Policy Board, and advised senior military and civilian policymakers.  In 2005, he published an influential Foreign Affairs article on "How to Win in Iraq". Informed by Krepinevich's previous research on Vietnam, the article called for the adoption of a population-centric counterinsurgency strategy much like the approach implemented during the "Surge" of U.S. forces two years later. In 2009 he published 7 Deadly Scenarios: A Military Futurist Explores War in the 21st Century, which presents seven hypothetical scenarios that would severely challenge the U.S. military.  His recent work has frequently addressed the challenges posed by the modernization of China's military forces, Iran's pursuit of nuclear weapons, and the proliferation of precision-guided munitions.

Krepinivich has also served as an adjunct professor at George Mason University, the School of Advanced International Studies at Johns Hopkins University and Georgetown University.

Most recently, Krepinevich co-authored, with his CSBA colleague Barry Watts, The Last Warrior: Andrew Marshall and the Shaping of Modern American Defense Strategy (Basic Books, January 2015).  Both authors had previously worked for Andrew Marshall (foreign policy strategist) at the Office of Net Assessment.

Krepinevich's pending departure from CSBA was announced following a July 2015 meeting by the think tank's board of directors.  In March 2016, he became a senior distinguished fellow at CSBA.

References

External links

Official CSBA Biography

1950 births
Living people
Place of birth missing (living people)
United States Military Academy alumni
Military personnel from New York (state)
United States Army officers
Harvard Kennedy School alumni
United States Military Academy faculty
Harvard University alumni
American male non-fiction writers
Center for Strategic and Budgetary Assessments
George Mason University faculty
Johns Hopkins University faculty
Georgetown University faculty